This is a list of sovereign states in the 1940s, giving an overview of states around the world during the period between 1 January 1940 and 31 December 1949. It contains 106 entries, arranged alphabetically, with information on the status and recognition of their sovereignty. It includes 99 widely recognized sovereign states, six entities which were de facto sovereign but which were not widely recognized by other states.

Academic datasets differ in terms of the number of states in the 1940s. At the start of the 1940s, the lowest estimate of the number of states is in the mid-50s whereas the highest is in the low-70s. At the end of the 1940s, the lowest estimate is in the mid-70s while the highest is in the mid-80s.

Sovereign states

Other entities
Excluded from the list above are the following noteworthy entities which either were not fully sovereign or did not claim to be independent:
   was divided into four zones of occupation by France, the United Kingdom, the United States, and the Soviet Union.
  China, Provisional Government of – Provisional Government of the Republic of China  was organized and recognized by Japan military authority during Second Sino-Japanese War.
  China, Reformed Government of – Reformed Government of the Republic of China  was organized and recognized by Japan military authority during Second Sino-Japanese War.
 East Turkestan, officially the East Turkistan Republic, existed from November 12, 1944 to December 22, 1949, when it was conquered by China.
  was incorporated into the Soviet Union in 1940, but the legality of the annexation was not widely recognized. The Baltic diplomatic services in the West continued to be recognised as representing the de jure state.
  was incorporated into the Soviet Union in 1940, but the legality of the annexation was not widely recognized. The Baltic diplomatic services in the West continued to be recognised as representing the de jure state.
  was incorporated into the Soviet Union in 1940, but the legality of the annexation was not widely recognized. The Baltic diplomatic services in the West continued to be recognised as representing the de jure state.
  – Great Empire of Manchuria  was organized and recognized by Japan military authority after Mukden Incident. Recognized by Axis powers member states.
  – Mongol Military Government   was organized and recognized by Japan military authority during Second Sino-Japanese War. Recognized by Axis powers member states.
  National Government of the Republic of China – National Government of the Republic of China  was organized and recognized by Japanese military, combined Reformed Government and Provisional Government together. Recognized by Axis powers member states.
 The Saudi Arabian–Iraqi neutral zone was a strip of neutral territory between Iraq and Saudi Arabia.
 The Saudi Arabian–Kuwaiti neutral zone was a strip of neutral territory between Kuwait and Saudi Arabia.
  Slovakia – Slovak Republic  was organized and recognized by German military after Munich Agreement. Recognized by Axis powers member states. Recognized by Axis powers member states and several neutral states. 
  The Sovereign Military Order of Malta was an entity claiming sovereignty. The order had bi-lateral diplomatic relations with a large number of states, but had no territory other than extraterritorial areas within Rome. Although the order frequently asserted its sovereignty, it did not claim to be a sovereign state. It lacked a defined territory. Since all its members were citizens of other states, almost all of them lived in their native countries, and those who resided in the order's extraterritorial properties in Rome did so only in connection with their official duties, the order lacked the characteristic of having a permanent population.
  Tangier was an international zone under the joint administration of France, Spain, the United Kingdom, Italy, Portugal and Belgium.
  West Berlin  was a political enclave that was closely aligned with – but not actually a part of – West Germany. It consisted of three occupied sectors administered by the United States, the United Kingdom, and France.

Notes

References

1940-1949
1940s politics-related lists
1940 in international relations
1941 in international relations
1942 in international relations
1943 in international relations
1944 in international relations
1945 in international relations
1946 in international relations
1947 in international relations
1948 in international relations
1949 in international relations